WTHA-LP (107.1 FM) was a radio station broadcasting a Classic rock music format. Licensed to Seaside, Florida, United States, the station served the Ft. Walton Beach area. The station was owned by Seaside School, Inc.

History
The station was assigned the call letters WSWC-LP on 2003-06-13. On 2003-12-08, the station changed its call sign to WTHA-LP.

Seaside School surrendered WTHA-LP's license to the Federal Communications Commission (FCC) on January 22, 2015. The FCC cancelled the license on February 12, 2015.

References

External links
 

THA-LP
Radio stations established in 2004
THA-LP
Defunct radio stations in the United States
Radio stations disestablished in 2015
2004 establishments in Florida
2015 disestablishments in Florida
THA-LP